Brentingby is a village in Leicestershire, England.The population is included in the civil parish of Freeby.

The village's name means either 'farm/settlement of Brenting/Branting' or 'farm/settlement at the steep place'.

References

See also
St Mary's Church, Brentingby

Villages in Leicestershire
Borough of Melton